Karl Gösta Prüzelius (11 August 1922 – 15 May 2000) was a Swedish actor. His first film part was in the 1945 film Flickorna i Småland. He played in films as diverse as Summer with Monika, Space Invasion of Lapland, Fanny and Alexander, and Ingmar Bergman's film version of The Magic Flute (1975). He also provided the Swedish voice for Bagheera in Disney's The Jungle Book (1967), and played the policeman Klöverhage in a number of the Åsa-Nisse films.

Gösta Prüzelius worked at Sweden's Royal Dramatic Theatre in Stockholm from 1964 and for more than 30 years.

On television, Gösta Prüzelius starred in the long-running soap opera Rederiet, where he played the main character, shipping company owner Reidar Dahlén, from the series' start in 1992 until his death.

Selected filmography

 The Girls in Smaland (1945) - Agronomist
 Åsa-Hanna (1946) - Magnus Pettersson
 Johansson and Vestman (1946) - Lieutenant (uncredited)
 It Rains on Our Love (1946) - Police constable (uncredited)
 Iris and the Lieutenant (1946) - Officer (uncredited)
 Tösen från Stormyrtorpet (1947) - Young man at the dance (uncredited)
 Loffe the Tramp (1948) - Police Officer
 Jungfrun på Jungfrusund (1949) - Lt. Bo Tillgren
 Love Wins Out (1949) - Red Cross-worker (uncredited)
 Bohus Battalion (1949) - Kurt Kronborg
 Kvartetten som sprängdes (1950) - Photographer (scenes deleted)
 Beef and the Banana (1951) - Tage Wendel
 Sköna Helena (1951) - Guest (uncredited)
 Han glömde henne aldrig (1952) - Tore (uncredited)
 Summer with Monika (1953) - Försäljare hos Forsbergs
 Barabbas (1953) - Member of Barabbas' Gang (uncredited)
 Kungen av Dalarna (1953) - Historic expert (uncredited)
 The Chieftain of Göinge (1953) - Mårten (uncredited)
 Aldrig med min kofot eller... Drömtjuven (1954) - Lind
 Seger i mörker (1954) - Engineer Gyllsdorf
 A Lesson in Love (1954) - Ticket Inspector in Train (uncredited)
 Simon the Sinner (1954) - Policeman
 The Yellow Squadron (1954) - Drunk (uncredited)
 Herr Arnes penningar (1954) - Courier
 The Dance Hall (1955) - Rolf Svensson
 Dreams (1955) - Man on the train (scenes deleted)
 Whoops! (1955) - Custom Official
 Åsa-Nisse ordnar allt (1955) - Klöverhage
 Violence (1955) - District attorney
 The Unicorn (1955)- Officer at the ball (uncredited)
 Paradise (1955) - Member of sobriety organization
 Smiles of a Summer Night (1955) - Servant (uncredited)
 Laughing in the Sunshine (1956) - Man
 Rätten att älska (1956) - Parent
 The Stranger from the Sky (1956) - Mr. Wahlström, newlywed couple
 På heder och skoj (1956) - August Persson
 Girls Without Rooms (1956) - Berndtsen
 Åsa-Nisse flyger i luften (1956) - Constable
 The Staffan Stolle Story (1956) - Badföreståndare (uncredited)
 When the Mills are Running (1956) - Sidenius
 The Seventh Seal (1957) - Man (uncredited)
 Som man bäddar... (1957) - Customs Officer
 The Halo Is Slipping (1957) - Maitre d' (uncredited)
 91:an Karlsson slår knockout (1957) - Doctor
 Klarar Bananen Biffen? (1957) - Dr. Werner (uncredited)
 Åsa-Nisse i full fart (1957) - Constable Klöverhage
 A Guest in His Own House (1957) - Doctor (uncredited)
 Night Light (1957) - Pettersson
 Enslingen Johannes (1957) - Producer
 The Jazz Boy (1958) - Journalfilmsklipparen
 Line Six (1958) - Office manager
 Miss April (1958) - Policeman (uncredited)
 Guldgrävarna (1959) - Gang Leader
 Fröken Chic (1959) - Dr. Klewerud (uncredited)
 Enslingen i blåsväder (1959) - Roth
 Space Invasion of Lapland (1959) - Dr. Walter Ullman
 Fridolfs farliga ålder (1959) - Dr. Privén
 Bara en kypare (1959) - Ritz Personnel Manager (uncredited)
 Heaven and Pancake (1959)- Banana Boat Captain (uncredited)
 Sängkammartjuven (1959) - Police inspector (uncredited)
 A Lion in Town (1959) - Police Officer
 Åsa-Nisse as a Policeman (1960) - Klöverhage
 En nolla för mycket (1962) - Georg Berg
 All These Women (1964) - Swedish Radio Reporter (uncredited)
 Hej du glada sommar!!! (1965) - Georg Brander
 Ön (1966) - Berg
 Träfracken (1966) - Melander
 Adamsson i Sverige (1966) - Sergeant Major
 Sarons ros och gubbarna i Knohult (1968) - Klöverhage (uncredited)
 Shame (1968) - Kyrkoherden i förhörslokalen
 Freddy klarar biffen (1968) - Manfred Marsing
 Fanny Hill (1968) - Stig Boman, Rogers father
 Miss and Mrs Sweden (1969) - Randberg (uncredited)
 Skräcken har 1000 ögon (1970) - Leif, Doctor
 Klara Lust (1972) - Helge's Father
 Jorden runt med Fanny Hill (1974) - Fanny's Lawyer
 Vita Nejlikan (1974) - Policeman
 Rännstensungar (1974) - Manager Högstrand
 The Magic Flute (1975, TV Movie) - Första prästen
 Face to Face (1976)
 Paradise Place (1977) - Carl-Henrik
 91:an och generalernas fnatt (1977) - Col. Gyllenskalp
 Man måste ju leva... (1978) - Managing Director
 Charlotte Löwensköld (1979) - Organist Sundler
 Flygnivå 450 (1980) - Pyrro
 To Be a Millionaire (1980) - Bertil
 Der Mann, der sich in Luft auflöste (1980) - Hammar
 Fanny and Alexander (1982) - Doctor Fürstenberg - Ekdahlska huset
 Raskenstam (1983) - Doctor
 The Best Intentions (1992) - Länsman

References

"Han blev Gösta med miljoner svenskar"; article in Aftonbladet about Prüzelius' life, published May 16, 2000

External links

Swedish male television actors
1922 births
2000 deaths
Deaths from leukemia
Deaths from cancer in Sweden
20th-century Swedish male actors